Jesse Bogdonoff (born April 1, 1955) is a former Bank of America financial advisor to the government of Tonga and court jester of Taufa'ahau Tupou IV, the king of Tonga. He was embroiled in a financial scandal.

Scandal

Bogdonoff made headlines in 2001 and 2002 after being accused of mismanaging millions of dollars from the nation of Tonga. He had been the Tongan government's financial advisor since 1994, claiming to have made the government millions in the rising stock markets of the booming 1990s. Bogdonoff managed the Tonga Trust Fund after it had been funded by the Tongan government in 1986 in a scheme in which the Tongan government sold passports to frightened Hong Kong nationals who were unnerved by the 1997 expiration of the British lease on Hong Kong from China.

In 1999 Bogdonoff recommended moving the Tongan portfolio out of the bulging stock market bubble and into a pool of insurance backed investments called viatical contracts managed by the Millennium Asset Management Company. In 2001 he learned that Herchell Hyatt, the owner of Millennium Asset Management Company, had stolen millions of Tonga's money and filed false accounting statements for the Tonga account. Bogdonoff arranged a recovery program for Tonga backed by Lloyd's of London to protect against the losses.

The Tongan government became paralyzed in an internal political debate led by the Tongan democracy movement in its effort to gain ground by embarrassing the royal family, which dismissed the only senior government ministers who were attempting to implement the recovery plan to save the Tonga Trust Fund. Without the recovery plan the Tonga Trust Fund was effectively wiped out. The government proceeded to sue Bogdonoff and all the parties involved in the transaction for fraud and negligence.

Without admitting guilt of any fraud, Bogdonoff settled his part of the lawsuit in 2004.

Post-scandal life
As of 2006, Bogdonoff has not been to Tonga since 2004 due to his history there. He was not present during King Taufa'ahau Tupou IV's funeral in September 2006. Bogdonoff claimed he was concerned for his safety due to the large number of Tongan citizens who have settled in the United States. He now offers classes in hypnosis and is a clinical therapist using hypnosis to aid in recovery from post traumatic stress. As of 2006, now called Jesse Dean, he is the founder and sole practitioner of the Open Window Institute of Emotional Freedom in Sonoma County, California.

Jester
Bogdonoff's status as official court jester of Tupou's court made sensational news when the financial scandal hit the media in 2001. Tonga was the first royal court to appoint a court jester in modern times, being appointed in 1999. However, the royal decree was issued on Bogdanoff’s birthday, April 1st, so it is not clear if the appointment was made in full seriousness.

References

1955 births
American expatriates in Tonga
Economic history of Tonga
Jesters
Living people